René Dosière (born 3 August 1941) is a retired French politician and activist who served as a member of the National Assembly from 1988 to 1993 and again from 1997 until 2017. He represented the 1st constituency of the Aisne department, and was a member of the Socialiste, radical, citoyen et divers gauche group. He was a member of the national bureau of the Jeunesse Etudiante Chrétienne between 1961 and 1962, in charge of high schools.

Born in Origny-Sainte-Benoite, Dosière is best known for his many questions to the government regarding the expenses of the services of the French presidency.

References

1941 births
Living people
People from Aisne
Politicians from Hauts-de-France
Socialist Party (France) politicians
Deputies of the 11th National Assembly of the French Fifth Republic
Deputies of the 12th National Assembly of the French Fifth Republic
Deputies of the 13th National Assembly of the French Fifth Republic
Deputies of the 14th National Assembly of the French Fifth Republic
Pantheon-Sorbonne University alumni